Asa Betham (1838 – unknown) was a sailor in the U.S. Navy during the American Civil War. He received the Medal of Honor for his actions during the Second Battle of Fort Fisher on January 15, 1865.

Military service
Betham enlisted in the Navy from New York City in July 1861, and was assigned to the Union side-wheel gunboat .

On January 15, 1865, the North Carolina Confederate stronghold of Fort Fisher was taken by a combined Union storming party of sailors, marines, and soldiers under the command of Admiral David Dixon Porter and General Alfred Terry. Betham was a member of the naval storming party.

Medal of Honor citation
The President of the United States of America, in the name of Congress, takes pleasure in presenting the Medal of Honor to Coxswain Asa Betham, United States Navy, for extraordinary heroism in action while serving on board the U.S.S. Pontoosuc during the capture of Fort Fisher and Wilmington, North Carolina, 24 December 1864, to 22 January 1865. Carrying out his duties faithfully during this period, Coxswain Betham was recommended for gallantry and skill and for his cool courage while under the fire of the enemy throughout these various actions.
General Orders: War Department, General Orders No. 59 (June 22, 1865)

Action Date: January 15, 1865

Service: Navy

Rank: Coxswain

Division: U.S.S. Pontoosuc

See also

List of American Civil War Medal of Honor recipients: A–F
List of Medal of Honor recipients for the Second Battle of Fort Fisher

References

1838 births
Year of death missing
Union Navy sailors
United States Navy Medal of Honor recipients
Military personnel from New York City
American Civil War recipients of the Medal of Honor